Patricia Marx is an American humorist and writer. She currently works as a staff writer for The New Yorker, and teaches at Columbia University, Princeton University and 92nd Street Y.

Born in Abington, Pennsylvania, she earned her B.A. from Harvard University in 1975. Her writing has appeared in The New York Times, The New Yorker, Vogue, and The Atlantic Monthly. Marx is a former writer for Saturday Night Live and Rugrats, and the first woman elected to the Harvard Lampoon. She is the author of the 2007 novel, Him Her Him Again The End of Him, as well as several humor books and children's books.

Bibliography

Books

Novels
 
 

Humor
 
 
Blockbuster, (with Douglas G. McGrath), (New York: Bantam Books, 1988)
You Know You're a Workaholic When--, (New York: Workman, 1993)
1,003 Great Things about Getting Older, (with Lisa Birnbach and Ann Hodgman, and David Owen), (Kansas City: Andrews McMeel, 1997)
1,003 Great Things about Kids, (with Lisa Birnbach and Ann Hodgman), (Kansas City: Andrews McMeel, 1998)
1,003 Great Things about Friends, (with Lisa Birnbach and Ann Hodgman), (Kansas City: Andrews McMeel, 1999)
The Skinny: What Every Skinny Woman Knows about Dieting (and Won't Tell You!), (with Susan Sistrom), humor (New York: Dell, 1999)
1,003 Great Things about Teachers, (with Lisa Birnbach and Ann Hodgman), (Kansas City: Andrews McMeel, 2000)
1,003 Great Things about Moms, (with Lisa Birnbach and Ann Hodgman), (Kansas City: Andrews McMeel, 2002)
1,003 Great Things about America, (with Lisa Birnbach and Ann Hodgman), (Kansas City: Andrews McMeel, 2002)
 
 
 
You Know You're 40 When--, (with Ann Hodgman), (New York: Broadway Books, 2004)
 
Why Don't You Write My Eulogy Now So I Can Correct It? (illustrated by Roz Chast), (New York: Celadon Books, 2019)
You Can Only Yell at Me for One Thing at a Time (illustrated by Roz Chast), (New York: Celadon Books, 2020)

Children's books
Dot in Larryland: The Big Little Book of an Odd-Sized Friendship, (illustrated by Roz Chast), (New York: Bloomsbury Publishing U.S.A. Children's Books, 2009)

Essays and reporting

References
Source: Contemporary Authors Online. The Gale Group, 2007. PEN (Permanent Entry Number):  0000175267.

 Dallas Morning News Mar 22, 1999
 "Harvard's Gifts to Gag Writing" New York Times - Mar 29, 1987
 "Speaking the Unspeakable (No Blushing Is Required)" New York Times - Jun 6, 1998

External links
  (interview with Patricia Marx)
  (review of Her Him Again the End of Him)
 

Living people
20th-century American novelists
20th-century American women writers
21st-century American novelists
21st-century American women writers
American humorists
American women novelists
The Harvard Lampoon alumni
The New Yorker people
Women humorists
Year of birth missing (living people)